KEGR-LP (94.1 FM, "94.1 The Kegger") is a radio station licensed to serve the community of Wasilla, Alaska. The station is owned by Rage, Inc., and airs a variety format.

The station was assigned the KEGR-LP call letters by the Federal Communications Commission on August 31, 2014.

References

External links
 Official Website
 FCC Public Inspection File for KEGR-LP
 

EGR-LP
EGR-LP
Radio stations established in 2016
2016 establishments in Alaska
Variety radio stations in the United States
Matanuska-Susitna Borough, Alaska